Asparagus persicus, is a  flowering plant in the Asparagaceae family. It grows between 800-1700 and is native to Turkey, Iran, Afghanistan, Uzbekistan, Tajikistan, Kazakhstan, China, Russia. It is perennial herbaceous halophyte plant up to 1.5 m tall. It is dioecious, with male and female flowers on separate plants.

References 

persicus
Flora of Turkey
Flora of Iran
Flora of Afghanistan
Flora of Uzbekistan
Flora of Tajikistan
Flora of Kazakhstan
Flora of China
Flora of Russia
Plants described in 1875
Taxa named by John Gilbert Baker
Dioecious plants